Aleksandar Trajković (born 16 January 1981) is a Serbian football defender.

Honours
Ordabasy
 Kazakhstan Cup: 2011
 Kazakhstan Super Cup: 2012

References

External links
 

1981 births
Living people
Sportspeople from Niš
Association football defenders
Serbian footballers
FK Mladi Obilić players
FK Obilić players
FK Mladi Radnik players
FK Timok players
OFK Niš players
FK ČSK Čelarevo players
FK Radnički Niš players
FK Jagodina players
FK Sinđelić Niš players
Serbian SuperLiga players
Serbian expatriate footballers
Serbian expatriate sportspeople in Kazakhstan
Expatriate footballers in Kazakhstan
FC Ordabasy players
Serbian expatriate sportspeople in Iceland
Expatriate footballers in Iceland
Knattspyrnufélagið Víkingur players
1. deild karla players